The Presidential Standard of Pakistan is the official flag of the President of Pakistan.

Design 

The Presidential Standard consists of the background of the Flag of Pakistan with the gold Presidential Crest replacing the white crescent and star found in the Flag of Pakistan. The Presidential Crest consists of a smaller crescent and star flanked by wheat branches with the words "Pakistan" written in Urdu underneath.

Use 

The Presidential Standard is displayed only in the presence of the President of Pakistan, particularly in the office and official residence of the President of Pakistan. It is always displayed alongside the Flag of Pakistan. It is also flown alongside the Flag of Pakistan in the Presidential motorcade. The Presidential Standard is never flown atop any building.

History 

The Presidential Standard was first adopted in 1956 and has since been redesigned twice: in 1974 and 1998.

See also 

 List of Pakistani flags
 Coat of arms of Pakistan
 National Anthem of Pakistan

Flags of Pakistan
Pakistan

Pakistan
Flags introduced in 1956